A food desert is an area that has limited access to affordable and nutritious food. In contrast, an area with greater access to supermarkets and vegetable shops with fresh foods may be called a food oasis. The designation considers the type and the quality of food available to the population, in addition to the accessibility of the food through the size and the proximity of the food stores.

In 2017, the United States Department of Agriculture reported that 39.5 million people or 12.8% of the population were living in low-income and low-access areas. Of this number, 19 million people live in "food deserts," low-income census tracts that are more than one mile from a supermarket in urban or suburban areas and more than 10 miles from a supermarket in rural areas.

Food deserts tend to be inhabited by low-income residents with inadequate access to transportation, which makes them less attractive markets for large supermarket chains. These areas lack suppliers of fresh foods, such as meats, fruits, and vegetables. Instead, available foods are likely to be processed and high in sugar and fats, which are known contributors to obesity in the United States.

History 
By 1973, the term "desert" was ascribed to suburban areas lacking amenities important for community development. A report by Cummins and Macintyre states that a resident of public housing in western Scotland supposedly coined the more specific phrase "food desert" in the early 1990s. The phrase was first officially used in a 1995 document from a policy working group on the Low Income Project Team of the UK's Nutrition Task Force.

Initial research was narrowed to the impact of retail migration from the urban center. More recent studies explored the impact of food deserts in other geographic areas (such as rural and frontier) and among specific populations like minorities and the elderly. The studies addressed the relationships between the quality (access and availability) of retail food environments, the price of food, and obesity. Environmental factors can also contribute to people's eating behaviors. Research conducted with variations in methods draws a more complete perspective of "multilevel influences of the retail food environment on eating behaviors (and risk of obesity)."

In the years since, the Food Justice Movement has remapped its advocacy by not only citing how predominately white the movement is but also by arguing that food insecurity is an issue directly related to racial inequality in the United States. The commercial flight from urban neighborhoods, for instance, is considered one of the many reasons for a lack of supermarkets in urban areas. The absence of grocery stores in urban communities can be attributed to middle-income whites moving out of the cities and into the suburbs. Subsidized by government loans, businesses also went to the suburbs. There is a racially disparate impact in how large grocery companies choose the locations of new stores, with suburban areas being often chosen over urban centers. In an attempt to open supermarkets in urban neighborhoods, many have found it difficult as the costs to maintain a grocery store is expensive as compared to the suburbs, and the city's costly ordinances inherently make it difficult to keep the stores.

Advocates within the movement have identified that terms like "Food Desert" undermines how the intersections of race and class largely influences minority communities' inaccessibility to fresh foods. To better describe what is taking place many advocates have begun to use the term "food apartheid." The activist and community organizer Karen Washington describes the term as "[looking] at the whole food system, along with race, geography, faith, and economics." As a result, there has been a paradigm shift within the movement with community organizers encouraging members of affected neighborhoods to consider how inadequate food systems correlate with the intersectionality of race and class. The Planting Seeds Just Tour serves as an example, as it visited solution based projects to resist injustices with ecological wisdom and food justice that were run by women of color. The tour also highlighted economically viable alternatives to provide healthy food and created spaces in which community members could participate in conversations regarding sustainability.

Definitions 
Researchers employ a variety of methods to assess food deserts including directories and census data, focus groups, food store assessments, food use inventories, geographic information system (GIS), interviews, questionnaires and surveys measuring consumers' food access perceptions. Differences in the definition of a food desert vary according to the following:
 The type of area, urban or rural
 Economic barriers and affordability of accessing nutritious foods, including the cost of transportation, price of foods, and incomes of those in the area
 The distance to the nearest supermarket or grocery store
 number of supermarkets in the given area
 type of foods offered, whether it be fresh or prepared
 nutritional values of the foods offered

The multitude of definitions, varying by country, has fueled controversy over the existence of food deserts.

It should also be noted that because it is too costly to survey the types of foods and prices offered in every store, researchers use the availability of supermarkets and large grocery stores (including discount and supercenter stores) as a proxy for the availability of affordable nutritious food.

Distance 
Distance-based measurements measure food accessibility to identify food deserts.

The United States Department of Agriculture (USDA) Economic Research Service measures distance by dividing the country into multiple 0.5 km square grids. The distance from the geographic center of each grid to the nearest grocery store gauges food accessibility for the people living in that grid. Health Canada divides areas into buffer zones, with people's homes, schools, or workplaces as the center. The Euclidean distance, another method to measure distance, is the shortest distance between the two points of interest and is measured for gaining food access data, but it is a less effective distance metric than the Manhattan Distance.

Different factors are excluded or included that affect the scale of distance. The USDA maintains an online interactive mapping tool for the United States, the "Food Access Research Atlas," which applies four different measurement standards to identify areas of low food access, based on distance from the nearest supermarket.

The first standard uses the original USDA food desert mapping tool "Food Desert Locator" and defines food deserts as having at least 33% or 500 people of a census tract's population in an urban area living 1 mile (10 miles for rural area) from a large grocery store or supermarket.

The second and third standards adjust the scale of distance and factor income to define a food desert. The availability of other fresh food sources like community gardens and food banks are not included in mapping and can change the number of communities that should be classified as food deserts. A 2014 geographical survey found that the average distance from a grocery store was 1.76 kilometers (1.09 miles) in Edmonton but only 1.44 kilometers (0.89 miles) when farmers' markets and community gardens were included, which makes it 0.11 miles under the latter definition for an urban food desert.

The fourth standard takes vehicular mobility into account. In the US, a food desert has 100 households or more with no vehicle access living at least  from the nearest large grocery store. Travel duration and mode may be other important factors. As of 2011, public transport is not included in mapping tools.

Fresh food availability 
A food retailer is typically considered to be a healthful food provider if it sells a variety of fresh food, including fruits and vegetables. Types of fresh food retailers include the following:
 supermarkets
 local grocery stores
 warehouse clubs
 community gardens
 farmers' markets

Food retailers like fast-food restaurants and convenience stores are typically not in this category as they usually offer a limited variety of foods that constitutes a healthy diet. Frequently, even if there is produce sold at convenience stores, it is of poor quality. A "healthy" bodega, as defined by the New York City Department of Health and Mental Hygiene, stocks seven or more varieties of fresh fruits and vegetables and low-fat milk.

Different countries have different dietary models and views on nutrition. The distinct national nutrition guides add to the controversy surrounding the definition of food deserts. Since a food desert is defined as an area with limited access to nutritious foods, a universal identification of them cannot be created without a global consensus on nutrition.

Income and food prices 
Other criteria include affordability and income level. According to the USDA, researchers should "consider... [the] prices of foods faced by individuals and areas" and how "prices affect the shopping and consumption behaviors of consumers." One study maintains that estimates of how many people live in food deserts must include the cost of food in supermarkets that can be reached in relation to their income.

For instance, in 2013, Whole Foods Market opened a store in the New Center area of Detroit, where one third of the population lives below the poverty line. Whole Foods is known for its more expensive healthy and organic foods. To attract low income residents, the Detroit store offered lower prices than other Whole Foods stores. If Whole Foods had not lowered the prices, residents would not be willing to shop there, and that area of Detroit would still be considered a food desert.

Rural food deserts 
The differences between a rural and an urban food desert are the population density of residents and their distance from the nearest supermarket. Twenty percent of rural areas in the U.S. are classified as food deserts. There are small areas within each state in the U.S. that are classified as rural food deserts, but they occur most prominently in the  Midwest. Within these counties, approximately 2.4 million individuals have low access to a large supermarket. The difference in distance translates into pronounced economic and transportation differencees between rural and urban areas. Rural food deserts are mostly the result of large supermarket stores moving into areas and creating competition that makes it impossible for small businesses to survive. The competition causes many small grocers to go out of business. That makes the task of getting nutritious whole ingredients much more difficult for those who live far away from large supermarkets.

In most cases, people who live in rural food deserts are more likely to lack a high school degree or GED, to experience increased poverty rates, and to have lower median family income. People who live in rural food deserts also tend to be older because of an exodus of young people (ages 20–29) born in such areas who decide to leave them once they can.

Based on the 2013 County Health Ratings data, residents who live in rural U.S. food deserts are more likely to have poorer health than those who live in urban food deserts. People who live in rural communities have significantly lower scores in the areas of health behavior, morbidity factors, clinical care, and physical environment. Research attributes the discrepancies to a variety of factors, including limitations in infrastructure, socioeconomic differences, insurance coverage deficiencies, and a higher rate of traffic fatalities and accidents.

A 2009 study showed that of the people polled, 64% did not have access to adequate daily amounts of vegetables, and 44.8% did not have access to adequate daily amounts of fruits. Comparatively, only 29.8% of those polled lacked access to adequate protein. The lack of access to fruits and vegetables often results in vitamin deficiencies, which eventually causes health problems for those who live within these areas. Tasked with finding a solution to the problem, research has shown that it takes individual and community actions, as well as public policy improvements, to maintain and increase the capacity of rural grocery stores to provide nutritious high-quality affordable foods and to be profitable enough to stay in business.

Although personal factors do impact eating behavior for rural people, it is the physical and social environments that place constraints on food access, even in civically engaged communities. Food access may be improved in communities in which civic engagement is strong and local organizations join in providing solutions to help decrease barriers of food access. Some ways that communities can do so are increasing access to the normal and food safety net systems and creating informal alternatives. Some informal communal alternatives could be community food gardens and informal transportation networks. Further, existing federal programs could be boosted through greater volunteer involvement.

A 2009 study of rural food deserts found key differences in overall health, access to food, and the social environment of rural residents when they were compared to urban dwellers. Rural residents report overall poorer health and more physical limitations, with 12% rating their health as fair or poor, compared to 9% of urban residents. They believed their current health conditions to be shaped by their eating behaviors when the future chronic disease risk was affected by the history of dietary intake. Moreover, the 57 recruited rural residents from Minnesota and Iowa in one study perceived that food quality and variety in their area were poor at times. The researchers reached the conclusion that for a community of people, food choice bound by family and household socioeconomic status remained as a personal challenge, but social and physical environments played a significant role in stressing and in shaping their dietary behaviors.

Urban food deserts 
Food deserts occur in poor urban areas with limited or no access to healthful affordable food options. Low income families are more likely to not have access to transportation so tend to be negatively affected by food deserts. An influx of people moving into such urban areas has magnified the existing problems of food access. Urban areas have been progressing in terms of certain opportunities, but the poor continue to struggle. As people move to urban areas, they have been forced to adopt new methods for cooking and acquiring food. Adults in urban areas tend to be obese, but they have malnourished and underweight children. For many people, the reason for not being able to get nutritious food is a lack of supermarkets or grocery stores When supermarkets are inaccessible, it has been shown that vegetable and fruit consumption are lower. When prices are high and there is a lack of financial assistance, many living in places with limited grocery stores find themselves in a situation of being unable to get the food that they need. Another domain to food deserts is that they also tend to be found in places that poor minority communities reside. Sometimes, the issue with urban food deserts is not the lack of food in the area but rather the lack of nutritional knowledge about food.

According to research conducted by Tulane University in 2009, 2.3 million Americans lived more than one mile away from a supermarket and did not own a car. For those that live in urban food deserts, they often do not have access to culturally-appropriate foods. For many people who have health restrictions and food allergies, the effects of food deserts are further compounded. The time and cost it takes for people to go to the grocery store makes fast food more desirable. There is also a price variance in small grocery stores that prevents people in lower-income areas from purchasing healthier food options. Smaller grocery stores can be more expensive than the larger chains.

The term "urban food deserts" is traditionally applied to North America and Europe, but in recent years, the term has been extended to Africa as well. It has taken time for researchers to understand Africa's urban food deserts because the conventional understanding of the term must be reevaluated to fit Africa's unconventional supermarkets. There are three categories for food deserts: ability-related, assets-related, and attitude-related. Ability-related food deserts are "anything that physically prevents access to food which a consumer otherwise has the financial resources to purchase and the mental desire to buy." An asset-related food desert involves the absence of financial assets, which prevents consumption of desirable food that is otherwise available. Attitude-related food deserts are any state of mind that prevents consumers from accessing that foods they can otherwise physically bring into their home and have the necessary assets to procure. In Cape Town, South Africa, supermarkets take up a large portion of retail space. While supermarkets are expanding in poor neighborhoods in Cape Town, their food insecurity is growing at an alarming rate. That is one of the biggest roadblocks in understanding food deserts. Based on the European or American understanding of food deserts, the fact that there is access to supermarkets by definition would mean that Cape Town does not suffer from food deserts. Africa suffers from food deserts, and there is also a direct link between climate change and the rapid growth of food deserts. While supermarkets are expanding to areas in which they once did not exist, there is still a disparity when it comes to physical access. In Cape Town, asset-related urban food deserts are the main reason for food insecurity since its people cannot afford the food that they would prefer to eat.

Climate change plays an important role in urban food deserts because it directly affects accessibility. The main way that climate change affects food security and food deserts is by reducing the production of food. With the limited availability of a product, the price rises making it unavailable to those that cannot afford more expensive commodities. In Cape Town specifically, supermarkets rely directly on fresh produce from the nearby farm area. Climate change affect the production of food, and it can also damage capital assets that affect accessibility and utilization. Specifically in Cape Town, access to food deserts does not change their severity. With limited diversity in their diets, those who live in Cape Town are highly dependent on foods of low nutritional value and high calorific value. Using the European or American definition of food deserts would not take into account the dynamic market of other cultures and countries.

Crime plays an important role in food deserts. If businesses cannot operate safely, they tend to either close or relocate to more stable areas. Operating a business in a high-crime area is more costly than doing so in a more stable area, as security can be a significant cost. For example, a grocery store closing in Chicago cited "repeated crime" as a major factor leading to their closing. Periods of civil unrest can accelerate the flight of businesses in areas in which the expectation of safe operation is low. The 2020 protests for racial and social justice that included riots that destroyed businesses, and Chicago then had more food deserts than before. North American urban food deserts are the result of stores closing because of unprofitability, not because of companies refraining from entering a potential market area.

Beyond physical access 
The primary criterion for a food desert is its proximity to a healthy food market. When such a market is in reach for its residents, a food desert ceases to exist, but that does not mean that residents will now choose to eat healthily. A longitudinal study of food deserts in JAMA Internal Medicine shows that supermarket availability is generally unrelated to fruit and vegetable recommendations and overall diet quality.

The availability of unhealthy foods at supermarkets may affect that relationship because they tempt customers to purchase precooked foods, which tend to contain more preservatives. Supermarkets may have such an adverse effect because they put independently owned grocery stores out of business. Independently owned grocery stores have the benefit of being made of the community and so they can be more responsive to community needs. Therefore, simply providing healthier food access, according to Janne Boone-Heinonen et al., cannot eliminate food deserts, and such access must be paired with education.

In a 2018 article in Guernica, Karen Washington states that factors beyond physical access suggest the community should reexamine the word food desert itself. She believes "food apartheid" more accurately captures the circumstances surrounding access to affordable nutritious foods: "When we say food apartheid the real conversation can begin."

Access to food options is not the only barrier to healthier diets and improved health outcomes. Wrigley et al. collected data before and after a food desert intervention to explore factors affecting supermarket choice and perceptions regarding healthy diet in Leeds, United Kingdom. Pretests were administered prior to a new store opening and post-tests were delivered two years after the new store had opened. The results showed that nearly half of the food desert residents began shopping at the newly built store, but only modest improvements in diet were recorded.

A similar pilot study conducted by Cummins et al. focused on a community that was funded by the Pennsylvania Fresh Food Financing Initiative. It followed up after a grocery store was built in a food desert to assess the store's impact. The study found that "simply building new food retail stores may not be sufficient to promote behavior change related to diet." Studies like those show that living close to a store that is stocked with fruits and vegetables does not make a large impact on food choices.

A separate survey also found that supermarket and grocery store availability did not generally correlate with diet quality and fresh food intake. Pearson et al. further confirmed that physical access is not the sole determinant of fruit and vegetable consumption.

Work and family
People who have nonstandard work hours, including rotating or evening shifts, may have difficulty shopping at stores that close earlier and so opt instead to shop at fast food or convenience stores, which are generally open later. Under welfare-to-work reforms enacted in 1996, female adult recipients must log 20 hours a week of "work activity" to receive SNAP benefits. If they live in a food desert and have family responsibilities, working may also limit time to travel to obtain nutritious foods as well as prepare healthful meals and exercise.

Safety and store appearance 
Additional factors may include how different stores welcome different groups of people and nearness to liquor stores. Residents in a 2010 Chicago survey complained that in-store issues like poor upkeep and customer service were also impediments. Safety can also be an issue for those in high-crime areas, especially if they must walk while carrying food and maybe also with a child or children.

Fast food
A possible factor affecting obesity and other "diet-related diseases" is the proximity of fast food restaurants and convenience stores, compared to "full-access" grocery stores. Proximity to fast-food restaurants correlates with a higher BMI, and proximity to a grocery store correlates with a lower BMI, according to one study.

A 2011 review used fifteen years of data from the Coronary Artery Risk Development in Young Adults (CARDIA) study to examine the fast-food consumption of more than 5,000 young American adults aged 18–30 years in different geographic environments. The study found that fast-food consumption was directly related to the proximity of fast-food restaurants among low-income participants. 
The research team concluded that "alternative policy options such as targeting specific foods or shifting food costs (subsidization or taxation)" may be complementary and necessary to promote healthy eating habits and to increase the access to large food stores in specific regions and limit the availability of fast-food restaurants and small food stores. Some cities already restrict the location of fast-food and other food retailers that do not provide healthy food.

Fast-food restaurants are disproportionately located in low-income and minority neighborhoods and are often the closest and cheapest food options. "People living in the poorest SES areas have 2.5 times the exposure to fast-food restaurants as those living in the wealthiest areas." Multiple studies were also done in the US regarding racial/ethnic groups and the exposure to fast-food restaurants. One study in South Los Angeles, with a higher percentage of African Americans, found that there was less access to healthier stores and more access to fast food than in West Los Angeles, which has a lower African American population. Another study in New Orleans found that communities that were predominantly African American had 2.4 fast food restaurants per square mile, but predominantly-white neighborhoods had 1.5 fast food restaurants per square mile. Researchers found that fast-food companies purposely target minority neighborhoods in conducting market research to open new fast-food restaurants. Existing segregation makes it easier for fast-food companies to identify the target neighborhoods. That practice increases the concentration of fast-food restaurants in minority neighborhoods.

Behavior and social and cultural barriers 
The likelihood of being food insecure in the US for Latinos is 22.4%, for African Americans 26.1%, and for whites 10.5%. People who are food insecure often find themselves having to cut back more at the end of the month, when their finances or food stamps run out. Month to month, there are other special occasions that may warrant higher spending on food such as birthdays, holidays, and unplanned events. Because people who are food insecure are still fundamentally involved in society, they are faced with the other stressors of life as well as the additional frustration or guilt that comes with not being able to feed themselves or their family.

Steven Cummins also proposed that food availability is not the problem but eating habits. Pearson et al. urge food policy to focus on the social and cultural barriers to healthy eating. For instance, New York City's public-private Healthy Bodegas Initiative has aimed to encourage bodegas to carry milk and fresh produce and residents to purchase and consume them.

Pharmacies 
In addition to the close proximity of fast-food restaurants and convenience stores, many low-income communities contain a higher prevalence of pharmacies, compared to medium- or high-income communities. Such stores often contain a high number of snack foods, such as candy, sugary beverages, and salty snacks, which is within arm's reach of a cash register in 96% of pharmacies. While pharmacies are important in these communities, they act as yet another convenience store and so further expose low-income residents to non-nutritional food.

Nutrition 
Fresh produce provides the body with nutrients that help it function effectively. Vegetables are good sources of fiber; potassium; folate; iron; manganese; choline; and vitamins A, C, K, E, B6 and many more. Fruits are good sources of fiber, potassium, and vitamin C. The USDA recommends eating the whole fruit instead of fruit juice because juice itself has less fiber and added sugars. Dairy products contain nutrients such as calcium; phosphorus; riboflavin; protein; and vitamins A, D and B-12. Protein, a good source of vitamin B and lasting energy, can be found in both plant and animal products. The USDA also suggests to limit the percentage of daily calories for sugars (<10%), saturated fats (<10%) and sodium (<2,300 mg). Although small amounts of sugars, fats, and sodium are necessary for the body, they can lead to various diseases when consumed in large amounts.

Processed foods 
Even if they know the importance of nutrition, people may face an additional barrier, based on whether they even have the choice. Corner stores often only carry processed food, which eliminates the choice of eating fresh food. Processed food encompasses any type of food that has been modified from its original state from washing, cooking, or adding preservative or other additives. Because it is such a general category, processed foods can be broken down into four more specific groups: "unprocessed or minimally processed foods, processed culinary ingredients, processed foods (PFs), and ultra-processed foods and drinks (UPFDs)."

The original motivation for processing foods was to preserve them so that there would be less food waste and enough food to feed the population. By canning or drying fruits and vegetables to try to preserve them, some of the nutrients are lost and oftentimes sugar is added, which makes the product less healthy than when it was fresh. Similarly, with meats that are dried, salt is added to help in preservation, but that results in the meat has a higher sodium content. The ultra-processed foods were made not to be nutrient-rich but rather to satisfy cravings with high amounts of salts or sugars, which results in people eating more than they should of food that has no nutritional value. On the other hand, processed foods may be artificially enriched with food additives to include nutrients that many people are lacking in their diets, which may, in some cases, make up to some extent for a lack of fresh food. Some nutritionists may recommend eliminating processed foods from diets, but others see it as a way to reduce food scarcity and malnutrition. In 1990, the Nutrition Labeling and Education Act required nutrition facts labels on food so that people could see what and how much of something they were consuming. With that labeling, some companies listed things that were not added on the front, but they rarely added information about nutrients they added. Some scientists and nutritionists are looking into ways to create affordable processed foods that are high in essential nutrients and vitamins and also taste good so that the consumer is inclined to buy them.

In low-income urban areas, accessibility to fast food restaurants is sometimes better than accessibility to supermarkets.

Alcohol 
Many areas that are food deserts have disproportionately-high numbers of liquor stores. For example, East Oakland has 4 supermarkets and 40 liquor stores. Such communities are also often predominantly populated by ethnic minorities. Both Latinos and African Americans are predisposed to disease resulting from alcohol consumption. Some alcohol-related illnesses include stroke, hypertension, diabetes, colon and GI cancer, and obesity.

Implications for self-care 
Self-care, an essential component in the management of chronic conditions but also for healthy people, is greatly influenced by food choices and dietary intake. Limited access to nutritious foods in food deserts can greatly impact one's ability to engage in healthy practices. Access, affordability, and health literacy are all social determinants of health, which are accentuated by living in a food desert. There are two main health implications for those living in food deserts: overnutrition or undernutrition. The community may be undernourished, due to no access to food stores. The community may be overnourished by a lack of affordable supermarkets with whole foods and a higher concentration of convenience stores and fast food restaurants, which offer prepackaged foods often high in sugar, fat, and salt. Food security remains a problem for many low-income families, but the greatest challenge to living in a food desert is poor diet quality. Living in a food desert contributes to a higher prevalence of chronic diseases associated with being overweight. Persons living in a food desert often face barriers to self-care, particularly in accessing resources needed to change their dietary habits.

Transportation and geography 
People tend to make food choices based on what is available in their neighborhood. Food deserts often have a high density of fast-food restaurants and corner stores that offer prepared and processed foods.

In rural areas, food security is a major issue. Food security may imply either a complete lack of food, which contributes to undernourishment, or a lack of nutritious food, which contributes to overnourishment.

According to the United States Department of Agriculture (USDA), community food security "concerns the underlying social, economic, and institutional factors within a community that affect the quantity and quality of available food and its affordability or price relative to the sufficiency of financial resources available to acquire it." Rural areas tend have higher food insecurity than urban areas because food choices in rural areas are often restricted, with transportation being needed to access a major supermarket or a food supply that offers a wide, healthy variety of foods. Smaller convenience stores that do not offer as much produce.

It is critical to look at car ownership in relation to the distance and number of stores in the area. Distance from shops influences the quality of food eaten. A vehicle or access to public transportation is often needed to go to a grocery store. When neither a car nor public transportation is available, diets are rarely healthy because fast food and convenience stores are easier to access and do not cost as much money or time. Further, those who walk to food shops typically have poorer diets, which has been attributed to having to carry shopping bags home.

Impact
All of those limitations to nutritional foods have serious consequences for marginalized groups, as they are disproportionately represented in food deserts. Subsequently, dietary-related diseases continue to have a proportionately large impact in these communities, as can be seen in studies examining diabetes and lactose intolerance. There are 4.9 million non-Hispanic African Americans aged 20 years or older with diagnosed diabetes, according to the Centers for Disease Control (CDC) national survey data. In the United States, some degree of lactose indigestion occurs in an estimated 15% (6% to 19%) of Caucasians, 53% of Mexican Americans, 62% to 100% of Native Americans, 75-80% of African Americans, and 90% of Asian Americans. Additionally, racial and ethnic minorities have a higher prevalence of diabetes than whites and a higher rate of complication post-diabetes diagnosis.

In the long term, that can have crippling effects on the poorest Americans: "Chronic diet-related diseases can cause further financial struggles, producing expensive medical bills and making work difficult. In 2006, people with obesity paid an average of $1,429 more in medical expenses than the average American. Obesity is least prevalent among adults in the highest economic bracket."

A 2019 study published in The Quarterly Journal of Economics cast doubt on the notion that exposing poor neighborhoods to healthy groceries reduces nutritional inequality. The study found "that exposing low-income households to the same products and prices available to high-income households reduces nutritional inequality by only about 10 percent, while the remaining 90 percent is driven by differences in demand." Another study found that grocery stores are more closely spaced in poor neighborhoods and that there was no relation between children's food consumption, their weight, and the type of food available near their homes. Another study suggested that adding a grocery store near one's home was associated with an average BMI decrease of 0.115, which very small compared to the excess BMI of an obese person.

Initiatives and resources 
Recognition of food deserts as a major public health concern has prompted a number of initiatives to address the lack of resources available for those living in both urban and rural areas. On the larger scale, there have been national public policy initiatives.

United States Federal and state policy initiatives 
The United States government responded to food insecurity with several programs, one of which being the Domestic Nutrition Assistance Programs (DNAPs). Other programs include the Supplemental Nutrition Assistance Program (SNAP), the Special Supplement Nutrition Program for Women, Infants, and Children (WIC), and food pantries and emergency kitchens. However, there is still a significant lack of legislation on local and state levels to address the problem efficiently and adequately. As food insecurity has reached drastic levels, significant pressure for the government to qualify the problem as a human rights issue has proven futile.

In 2010, the US Department of Health and Human Services, the US Department of Agriculture, and the US Department of the Treasury announced their partnership in the development of the Healthy Food Financing Initiative (HFFI). Intending to expand access to healthy food options in both urban and rural communities across the country, HFFI has helped expand and develop grocery stores, corner stores, and farmers' markets by providing financial and technical assistance to communities. The creation of such resources provides nutritious food options to those living in food deserts. HFFI has awarded $195 million to community development organizations in 35 states. Between 2011 and 2015, HFFI created or supported 958 projects aimed at healthy food access.

The HFFI has also supported the development of statewide programs across the country, in California, Colorado, Illinois, Louisiana, Michigan, New Jersey, New York, Ohio, and Pennsylvania. In Pennsylvania, the state program, the Fresh Food Financing Initiative (FFFI), provides grants and loans to healthy food retailers to create or renovate markets, including supermarkets, small stores, and farmers' markets, in low-income urban and rural areas across Pennsylvania. Because operating in underserved areas is more financially straining on retailers, the program provides subsidized financing incentives for retailers to open in areas with a high need. The Pennsylvania program's success influenced many other states to launch similar programs.

Farmers' markets and community gardens
Local and community efforts have made strides in combating a lack of access to nutritious food in food deserts. Farmers' markets provide residents with fresh fruits and vegetables. Usually in public and central areas of a community, such as a park, farmers' markets are most effective if they are easily accessible. Farmers' markets tend to be more successful in urban than rural areas due to large geographic distances in rural areas that make the markets difficult to access. The expansion of SNAP to farmers' markets also helps make nutritious foods increasingly affordable. Each year, SNAP participants spend around $70 billion in benefits. As of 2015, more than $19.4 billion were redeemed at farmers' markets. The Double Up Food Bucks program doubles what every Electronic Benefit Transfer (EBT) dollar spent at a farm stand is worth. This incentivizes locals to shop for fresh foods, rather than processed foods. Community gardens can play a similar role in food deserts, generating fresh produce by having residents share in the maintenance of food production.

The Food Trust, a nonprofit organization based in Pennsylvania, has 22 farmers' markets in operation throughout Philadelphia. To increase accessibility for healthier food and fresh produce, Food Trust farmers' markets accept SNAP benefits. Customers have reported improved diets with an increase in vegetable intake as well as healthier snacking habits. Community gardens also address fresh food scarcity. The nonprofit group DC Urban Greens operates a community garden in Southeast Washington, DC, an area labeled by the US Department of Agriculture as a food desert. The garden provides fresh produce to those in the city who do not have easily-accessible grocery stores nearby. The organization also sets up farmers' markets in the city. In the food desert of North Las Vegas, a neighborhood with one of the highest levels of food insecurity, another community garden is addressing food scarcity. The community gardens can aid in education and access to new foods. Organizations such as the Detroit Black Community Food Security Network use community-building gardens to promote community around healthy food.

Food Co-Operations 
Food co-operations (co-ops) are defined as being community driven produce markets. Food co-ops have become a mechanism that communities have used in response to food deserts. Since they are run by community members, these groups can have a more direct decision to sell more culturally relevant and healthier produce to the overall community. Proponents to the implementation of food co-ops argue that it offers better dietary options which can uplift the most impacted communities in food deserts. There have been efforts by urban American cities to implement food co-operations as a larger policy reform. Organizations like the West Oakland Food Collaborative have made food co-operations one of the components to their larger proposal to tackle food insecurity. There have also been efforts to integrate current federal aid to food co-operations.The Virginia Fresh Match (VFM) program worked with community efforts such as food co-ops to accept federally funded initiatives such as Supplemental Nutrition Assistance Program (SNAP) as a way to promote healthier eating habits.

Limitations to food co-operations come with the emphasis of community governance and different approaches to reallocate federal funding. Given that food co-ops are community run, maintaining the market requires community members to dedicate hours to it. However, it must be noted that all members of the community can shop at food co-ops. As well, previous government policy agreements with market chains have made it difficult for repurposing these now enclosed spaces, with the discontinued Albertsons market chains being a leading example of this predicament. Cities with food deserts, such as Detroit, Michigan, have advocated instead to create policies that financially incentivize healthy markets to build their establishments in these communities. Yet, research conducted in Flint, Michigan's food desert found that it is not community access that policy reform should focus on since the implementation of healthy grocery stores will not decrease food insecurity or create healthier diets.

Urban agriculture 
Urban agriculture (UA) is another way that helps when it comes to having access to fresh food in urban cities. Urban agriculture is one of the responses combating the lack of fresh foods in communities that need fresh foods. There are communities that are turning vacant lots into a community gardens and urban areas in which they can use agriculture to grow fresh foods for the community. Urban agriculture has many benefits such as being a "local source of fresh healthy food," and bringing communities together and reducing environmental problems. An issue with urban agriculture is that in many food desert communities, the soil has been contaminated from local pollutants, which makes it harder to use plots of land as a garden to grow fresh food. For example, in Oakland, California, there has been a rise in using urban agriculture as a means to get areas that are in the middle of food deserts to grow and produce their own food.

Meal delivery, food trucks, and ride shares
An entrepreneurial solution to food insecurity in food deserts is food trucks. In major urban centers such as Boston, mobile food markets travel to low-income areas with fresh produce. The trucks travel to assisted living communities, schools, workplaces, and health centers. The increased availability of online food retailers and delivery services, such as AmazonFresh and FreshDirect, can also help in food deserts by delivering food straight to residences. The ability of elderly people, disabled people, and people who live far from supermarkets to use SNAP benefits online to order groceries is a major resource. For those who lack transportation options, vehicle for hire services may be vital resources to increase access to nutritious foods in food deserts.

Youth education 
Food deserts are a result of reduced access to healthy food and not enough money to afford the available food, which causes many people and especially children to not get enough nutrients their bodies require. Because there is a dominant concern of where the next meal will come from, people do not always care what they are putting in their bodies as long as it keeps them alive. There are organizations that target the lack of access to fresh foods, multiple organizations implement education within their work. The Grow Hartford Program was implemented in a school in Connecticut to have students address an issue in their community and they chose to focus on food justice. The youth involved worked on farms in the area to learn about the processes of food production and the importance and variety of vegetables. The program even led kids to start a community garden at their school. The program allowed the students to engage in hands-on learning to educate them about agriculture, food scarcity, and nutrition while helping bridge the gap of food access for some of their peers who could now bring home food from the surrounding farms or the school garden. Another example of an organization that educates community members is Oakland Food Connection, located in East Oakland where they teach children about production and consumption through lessons on urban gardening with cooking classes. This program helps educate children about their own food culture and others while also learning about nutrition.

See also 

 Agroecology
 Banking desert
 Book desert
 Environmental racism
 Fenceline community
 Food choice
 Food choice of older adults
 Food deserts by country
 Food Empowerment Project
 Food safety
 Food security
 Food swamps (similar term)
 Ghetto tax
 Medical desert
 Nutrition
 Supermarket shortage
 Transit desert

References

Further reading 
 Annotated bibliography of literature on food environments
 Food desert in Richmond, CA
 Open Source Food

Economic geography
Desert
Desert
Urban decay
Food deserts